The 2013 Offaly Senior Hurling Championship was the 115th staging of the Offaly Senior Hurling Championship since its establishment in 1896. The championship began on 10 May 2013 and ended on 6 October 2013.

Kilcormac–Killoughey were the reigning champions, and they successfully defended their title following a 1-21 to 1-14 defeat of Birr.

Teams

Overview

All but one of the twelve teams from the 2012 championship participated in the top tier of Offaly hurling in 2013.

Lusmagh, who defeated St Rynagh's by 4-11 to 2-14 in the final of the intermediate championship in 2012, availed of their right to automatic promotion to the senior championship.

Similarly, Drumc defeated Shamrocks in the 2012 relegation play-off, and so Shamrocks were relegated to the intermediate grade for 2013.

Results

Group 1

Group 2

Relegation play-offs

Quarter-finals

Semi-finals

Final

References

Offaly Senior Hurling Championship
Offaly Senior Hurling Championship